This is a list of bisexual characters in fiction, i.e. characters that either self-identify as bisexual or have been identified by outside parties to be bisexual. Bisexuality is a sexual orientation that refers to the romantic and/or sexual attraction towards people of more than one gender. Listed characters are either recurring characters, cameos, guest stars, or one-off characters. This page does not include bisexual characters in films, television, anime, or Western animation.

Similar lists include trans, lesbian, gay, non-binary, pansexual, asexual, and intersex characters for information about fictional characters in other parts of the LGBTQ community.

The names are in alphabetical order by surname, or by single name if the character does not have a surname. If more than two characters are in one entry, the last name of the first character is used.

Graphic novels

Literature

Theatre

Video games

Webcomics

See also

 Bisexual politics
 Biphobia
 Bisexual erasure
 Lists of bisexual people
 Getting Bi: Voices of Bisexuals Around the World
 Portrait of a Marriage
 List of fictional polyamorous characters
 List of animated series with LGBTQ characters

Notes

References

Citations

Sources

 
 
 
 
 
 
 
 
 
 
 
 
 
 

 
 
bisexual
bisexual
bisexual

Bisexuality-related lists